Jomar Herculano Lourenço (born 28 September 1992), commonly known as Jomar, is a Brazilian footballer who plays as a center back.

Club career
Jomar joined the youth training centre of Vasco da Gama in 2011 and was promoted to the senior side the same year. He made his senior debut on 29 May 2011, in a Campeonato Brasileiro Série A game between Vasco and América-MG. During his nine years at the club he had threeloan spells away: the first at Rio Branco-SP in the first few months of 2013, and the second with Oeste Futebol Clube in the second half of 2018. At the start of 2019 he joined Bolivian side Oriente Petrolero on loan, but an injury prevented him from making any appearances and the loan was terminated early in May.

At the start of 2020, Jomar signed with Iporá, where he played eight games in the Campeonato Goiano, before the season was paused indefinitely in March, with Iporá releasing their whole squad.

On 24 February 2021, Jomar signed for Treze. He was not registered on the BID (Brazilian football player database) by the club, and the next month he joined Fluminense-PI.

References

External links

1992 births
Living people
Brazilian footballers
Campeonato Brasileiro Série A players
Campeonato Brasileiro Série B players
CR Vasco da Gama players
Oeste Futebol Clube
Iporá Esporte Clube players
Treze Futebol Clube players
Association football defenders
Footballers from Rio de Janeiro (city)
Fluminense Esporte Clube players